Ernest Vincent Loney (3 July 1882 – 27 August 1951) was a British athlete and member of the Birchfield Harriers athletics club. He competed at the 1908 Summer Olympics in London.

In the fourth round of the 1500 metres, Loney finished first with a time of 4:08.4 to qualify for the final. There, he pace set in an attempt to tire eventual winner Mel Sheppard and did not end up finishing the race.

References

Sources
 
 
 
 

1882 births
1951 deaths
Athletes (track and field) at the 1908 Summer Olympics
Olympic athletes of Great Britain
British male middle-distance runners